Mazarchevo is a village in Kyustendil Municipality, Kyustendil Province, south-western Bulgaria.

Population 
The village of Mazarchevo is losing many inhabitants due to emigration and a negative natural growth rate.

As of February 2011, there are no inhabitants aged under 30. However, there are 13 people aged 80 years or more. The village is quite old: the median age is about seventy years old.

References

Villages in Kyustendil Province